Cenabum, Cenabaum or Genabum was the name of an oppidum of the Carnutes tribe, situated on the site of what is now  Orléans. It was a prosperous commercial city on the river Loire at the time of Caesar's conquest of Gaul.

History 
This port was the commercial outlet for the grain produced in the Beauce. The city had strong fortifications, and also controlled a bridge over the Loire of considerable economic and strategic importance. Strabo, in his Geography, calls the city (Κήναβον) the 'emporium of the Carnutes (τὸ τῶν Καρνούντον ἑμπόριον ). Kenabon/Cenabum is probably a transcription of a Gallic word with the same sense.

For Caesar, it was imperative to secure control of this strategic location. He easily succeeded in establishing a protectorate over the Carnutes whilst assuring himself of the collaboration of  Tasgetios, whom he re-established on his ancestors' throne in return for services rendered. However, this situation came to an end after two years, when in 54 BC Tasgetios (considered a traitor) was assassinated and (in the dead of winter) Caesar ordered the occupation of Cenabum by Roman legions.

It was Cenabum which gave the signal for the Gallic revolt of which Vercingetorix quickly became the head and which was the motivation for Caesar's seventh Gallic campaign. In 53 BC, Roman merchants who had established themselves at Cenabum, the overseer Gaius Fufius Cita whom Caesar had installed there to control commerce and to ensure his legions' grain supply, and some Roman troops garrisoning the town were all massacred or thrown into the Loire by the Carnutes who had penetrated the city.

Rushing back from Italy at phenomenal speed and reaching Sens, Caesar reached Cenabum by forced marches and did not even need to besiege it. On his approach, its population attempted to flee via a wooden bridge linking the two banks of the Loire, whilst the Romans scaled the ramparts, captured the remaining inhabitants and pillaged and burned down the town. 

In the 3rd century AD, the emperor Aurelian rebuilt the ruined town (273-274), reconstructed its defences, detached the new town from the territory of the Carnutes (which it had until then depended upon), and named it after himself Aurelianum or civitas Aurelianorum, which later metamorphosed into the word Orléans.

Notes and references

See also 
 Autricum, Chartres, capital city of the Carnutes.

External links 
 History of the city of Orléans : From its origins to the Roman conquest : up to 52 BC
 The Orléanais in the time of the Gauls (Conseil Général du Loiret)
 History of the Gauls, Chapter VII

Oppida
History of Orléans
Populated places in pre-Roman Gaul
Archaeological sites in France
Former populated places in France
History of Centre-Val de Loire
Carnutes